Singaling Hkamti (also known as Zingalein Kamti and Zingkaling Hkamti) was a Shan state in what is today Burma. It was an outlying territory, away from the main Shan State area. The state was located on both sides of the Chindwin River, in what is present-day Hkamti District, Sagaing Region. Its capital was Singaling Hkamti town.

History
Singaling Hkamti was founded in 1820. It was a tributary state of the King of Burma until 1887, when the Shan states submitted to British rule after the fall of the Konbaung dynasty. Its inhabitants were mostly Shan people who were said to have come from Hkamti Long. Before the time of rule by the British the state was often raided by the Kachin people.
The state was integrated into Burma after independence from the British in 1948.

Rulers
The rulers of Singaling Hkamti bore the title Myosa.

Myosas
1820 - 1844                Sao Nyi Kaung 
1844 - 1853                Sao Ai 
1853 - 1882                Sao Hi 
1882 - 1887                Vacant
1887 - 1892                Sao Ni Taung                     (b. 1861 - d. 1892) 
1892 - 1893                Sao E -Regent (1st time)         (b. 1856 - d. 1927) 
1892 - 1894                Sao Hon                          (b. 1887 - d. 1894) 
1894 - 1898                Ma Pu (f)                        (d. c.1898)
1894 - 1898                Sao E -Regent (2nd time)         (s.a.) 
1898 - 1927                Sao E                            (s.a.) 
1927 - 1952                Maung Ba Thein

References

External links
The Imperial Gazetteer of India
"Gazetteer of Upper Burma and the Shan states"

Shan States